Owen Buckley (born 15 November 1998) is an English professional rugby league footballer who plays as a er for Widnes Vikings in the Betfred Championship.

Background
A former pupil at Sts Peter and Paul RC High School Owen played his junior rugby with local clubs West Bank Bears and Halton Farnworth Hornets before joining the Vikings’ Scholarship programme at the age of 15

Playing career

Widnes Vikings
He made his début for Widnes against Hull F.C. in 2018.

Swinton Lions (loan)
On 8 Jul 2021 it was reported that he had signed for Swinton Lions in the RFL Championship on a short-term 2-week loan, which was then later extended to a rolling week-by-week agreement

References

External links
Widnes Vikings profile
SL profile

1998 births
Living people
English rugby league players
North Wales Crusaders players
Rugby league players from Widnes
Rugby league wingers
Swinton Lions players
Widnes Vikings players